In Love and War (烽火飛花) is a TVB television series, premiered in 1981. Theme song "In Love and War" (烽火飛花) composition and arrangement by Joseph Koo, lyricist by Wong Jim, sung by Adam Cheng.

Trivia
This tv series was inserted from a 1958 american movie: In Love and War (1958 film) traced by an war in Japanese-American War.
in this tv series was defrently scenic set in a Sino-Japanese War.

1981 Hong Kong television series debuts
1981 Hong Kong television series endings
TVB dramas
Cantonese-language television shows